Frik was an Armenian poet of the 13th and 14th centuries. He wrote on both secular and religious topics, and many of his poems are characterized by social criticism. His verse is written in the spirit of religious fatalism.

Frik lived approximately from 1230 to 1310, during the time of Mongol rule over Armenia. Very little is known about his life. It is not known whether his name was really Frik or not; it may be a pseudonym or an abbreviated form of his original name. The scholar Hakob Zhamkochian considers it likely that Frik was from Western Armenia due to the similarity of his Armenian to the literary language of Cilician Armenia. Based on information and allusions in his poetry, it is believed that Frik was an educated and once wealthy man who was plagued by debts and misfortunes, perhaps due to an unsuccessful business endeavor. Frik's son was kidnapped by Mongols and he traveled the kingdom searching for his son (alternatively, he was forced to give up his son as security for a debt). Scholars disagree on whether Frik was a layman or a member of the clergy. He spent the last years of his life in a monastery, although it is not known for certain if he became a monk.

Poetry

More than 50 of Frik's poems have survived. Frik wrote his secular poems in colloquial language, while his religious and other works are written in literary Middle Armenian sprinkled with vernacular and foreign words. 

Many of Frik's poems contain criticisms of Mongol rule, the wealthy, the clergy, social inequality, injustice and human vices, sometimes in a satirical manner. Two of his well-known poems are "Complaint to Christ" and "Against Fate". Both express doubts regarding religious faith and questioned the values of those who called themselves “Christians” and did not act through with their words or beliefs.  Frik was a devoted Christian, but his poems contemplate fate and question how a just God could allow so much injustice and misery to exist in the world.

Frik remained popular until the 16th century, and interest in him was revived in the second half of the 19th century. The first (incomplete) collection of Frik's poems was published in 1930.

References

External links

Frik at the Digital Library Of Armenian Literature

13th-century births
14th-century deaths
13th-century Armenian poets
Armenian male poets
14th-century Armenian poets